Compagnie des Tabacs Comme Il Faut, S.A. is an international tobacco company based in Port-au-Prince, Haiti. It is owned by Luckett, Inc. of Louisville, KY and is the only cigarette maker in Haiti with its Comme Il Faut and Point brands marketed locally.

History
Comme Il Faut was founded in 1927. The tobacco company is best known for producing customized private label brands for its partners worldwide.

Thanks to a US$10M investment in advanced bulk processing machinery, the company now supplies stock and custom blend processed tobacco, or "cut rag" and it has the capacity to produce more than 20,000 kilos of tobacco per day.

In 2008 the company launched a lower-priced cigarette named Point on the Haitian market.

Contributions
The company sponsors popular Haitian musicians and musical groups such as Djakout Mizik, Gracia Delva, Kreyol La, and Mizik Mizik.

In December 2001 some of the company's representatives joined a $40M contract deal, signed by the Haitian government for the development of a Hilton-operated hotel in Port-au-Prince to extend tax breaks and other economic incentives. The project was later abandoned.

References

External links

1927 establishments in Haiti
Tobacco companies of Haiti
Companies based in Port-au-Prince